Dorothy Stone may refer to:

 Dorothy Stone (actress) (1905–1974), American actress
 Dorothy Maharam Stone (1917–2014), American mathematician